Brigadier William Marshall Fordham CB CBE (9 August 1875 – 9 December 1959) was a senior British Indian Army officer who served during the First World War.

Born on 9 August 1875, William Marshall Fordham was educated at Bedford School, between 1887 and 1893, and at Royal Military College, Sandhurst. He served on the North West Frontier, between 1897 and 1898, in China during the Boxer Rebellion, in 1900, during the First World War, between 1914 and 1918, and in Waziristan, between 1922 and 1923.

He was Aide-de-camp to King George V between 1930 and 1932 and Commander of the 1st Infantry Brigade, in Abbottabad, India between 1928 and 1932.

He retired from the British Indian Army in 1932.

Fordham was appointed Commander of the Order of the British Empire (CBE) in 1924 and Companion of the Order of the Bath (CB) in 1928. 
He died in Felixstowe on 9 December 1959.

References

1875 births
1959 deaths
People educated at Bedford School
Graduates of the Royal Military College, Sandhurst
Indian Army personnel of World War I
Companions of the Order of the Bath
British Indian Army officers
British people in colonial India